Crack My Nut is the third studio album by Dutch rock and roll band Claw Boys Claw. This was their last album on Polydor, which terminated the band's record deal the next year, citing disappointing sales. The album was recorded when the band's popularity was reaching a high point. The band had played all over Europe (including the Roskilde Festival) and had gained a strong reputation as a live band. Crack My Nut was produced by the Australian producer Victor Van Vugt, and was recorded in the Hansa Tonstudio in Berlin.

While Polydor may have been disappointed with the album's sales (it never charted), the band had a very successful year, winning the prestigious BV Popprijs and having their debut album, Shocking Shades of Claw Boys Claw, re-released by Polydor.

Track listing

Tracks 6 and 12 only on the CD version.

Personnel
John Cameron - guitar
Pete TeBos - vocals
Bobbie Rossini - bass
Marius Schrader - drums
Victor Van Vugt - producer
Recorded at Hansa Tonstudio, Berlin

References

See also
Claw Boys Claw discography

1987 albums
Claw Boys Claw albums
Albums produced by Victor Van Vugt
Polydor Records albums